Lydia N. Bean is an American sociologist. She authored an ethnographic book, The Politics of Evangelical Identity (2014), about Evangelical communities on the Canada–United States border. Bean is a fellow at New America and a faculty research associate at the University of Texas at Arlington. She was an assistant professor of sociology at Baylor University. Bean has been a Democratic candidate for the Texas House of Representatives and was a candidate for the 2021 Texas's 6th congressional district special election.

Education 
Bean completed a bachelor's degree in Spanish and music at Austin College in 2002. She earned a Ph.D. in sociology from Harvard University in June 2009. Bean's dissertation on the politics of evangelical identity in the United States and Canada became the basis of her 2014 book, The Politics of Evangelical Identity. The book incorporates ethnographic research from her time in Evangelical communities on both sides of the Canada–United States border. Her doctoral advisor was social scientist Robert J. Sampson.

Career 
Bean was an assistant professor of sociology at Baylor University. She later became a fellow at New America and a faculty research associate at the University of Texas at Arlington.

2020 Texas House of Representatives election

Bean was a Democratic candidate campaigning against incumbent Republican Matt Krause for District 93 in the 2020 Texas House of Representatives election. Priorities of her campaign included Medicaid expansion and fully funding public schools. Bean has been endorsed by pro-LGBT rights group Equality Texas. She has also been endorsed by the advocacy group, the National Democratic Redistricting Committee. 

A coalition that includes the National Democratic Redistricting Committee, the Texas House Democratic Campaign Committee, the Future Now Fund, The People PAC, and The Creative Resistance included Bean, along with 10 other Democratic candidates, in a $1.1 million digital advertising campaign. Two years prior, Bean's mother ran for the statehouse seat, spending $30,000 and receiving 46 percent of the vote.

2021 U.S. House special election

Bean was a Democratic candidate in the 2021 Texas's 6th congressional district special election. In the first round of voting, Bean finished in eighth place out of 23 candidates.

References

External links

Campaign website

Women in Texas politics
American women sociologists
American sociologists
Baylor University faculty
Texas Democrats
Politicians from Fort Worth, Texas
Candidates in the 2021 United States elections
University of Texas at Arlington faculty
21st-century American women writers
Austin College alumni
Harvard Graduate School of Arts and Sciences alumni
New America (organization)
American ethnographers
Year of birth missing (living people)
Living people